The 1952–53 1re série season was the 32nd season of the 1re série, the top level of ice hockey in France. Four teams participated in the final tournament, Paris Université Club won their first and only championship.

Final tournament

External links
Season on hockeyarchives.info

Fra
1952–53 in French ice hockey
Ligue Magnus seasons